Tawan Khotrsupho (Thai: ตะวัน โคตรสุโพธิ์, born 23 January 2000) is a Thai footballer currently playing as a forward or a winger for Chiangmai.

Career statistics

Club

Notes

Honours
BG Pathum United
 Thai League 1
  Champions  (1): 2020–21

References

External links
Tawan Khotrsupho at J.League (in Japanese)

2000 births
Living people
Tawan Khotrsupho
Tawan Khotrsupho
Thai expatriate footballers
Association football forwards
J1 League players
J3 League players
Tawan Khotrsupho
Tawan Khotrsupho
Cerezo Osaka U-23 players
Cerezo Osaka players
Thai expatriate sportspeople in Japan
Expatriate footballers in Japan